Parliamentary elections were held in the Trust Territory of the Pacific Islands on 5 November 1974. Carmen Bigler became the first female member of Congress after being elected to House of Representatives from the Fifth District of the Marshall Islands.

Electoral system
The bicameral Congress consisted of a 12-member Senate with two members from each of the six districts and a 21-member House of Representatives with seats apportioned to each district based on their population – five from Truk, four from the Marshall Islands and Ponape, three from the Mariana Islands and Palau and two from Yap.

Elections were held every two years in November of even-numbered years, with all members of the House of Representatives and half the Senate (one member from each district) renewed at each election.

Results
Twelve incumbent members of Congress were defeated, including Marianas Senator Edward Pangelinan, Truk Senator Andon Amaraich, Marianas representative Felipe Atalig and Marshallese representative John Heine, who was unseated by Bigler.

Senate

House of Representatives

Aftermath
Following the elections, Tosiwo Nakayama was re-elected President of the Senate, whilst Bethwel Henry was re-elected Speaker of the House of Representatives.

The election of three members – Lambert Aafin, Chiro Albert and Edgar Edwards – was challenged, with claims of irregularities. The Credential Committee recommended overturning the election of Aafin, ordering a by-election and launching a criminal investigation into the officials involved in the case. However, in a secret ballot, members of Congress voted to allow Aafin to take his seat by a vote of 9–8.

References

Trust
Elections in the Federated States of Micronesia
Elections in the Marshall Islands
Elections in Palau
Elections in the Northern Mariana Islands
1974 in the Trust Territory of the Pacific Islands